Robert Joyce "Shorty" Raudman (born March 14, 1942) is a retired American professional baseball player, an outfielder whose eight-season (1961–68) career included 16 games played in Major League Baseball, divided between the  and  Chicago Cubs.

Despite his size, he was a power hitter in minor league baseball, amassing 17 or more home runs in four of his eight pro seasons.

His first Cub trial came after he hit 20 homers with 84 runs batted in for the 1966 Tacoma Cubs of the Triple-A Pacific Coast League. He started eight games in left field in September and collected seven hits, including two doubles. In 1967, he hit 17 home runs for Tacoma, sandwiched between brief appearances with the Cubs in April and September, then was traded on November 21, 1967, to the Cleveland Indians (to complete an earlier deal for pitcher Dick Radatz). The Indians then immediately packaged Raudman, pitcher George Culver and first baseman Fred Whitfield to obtain outfielder Tommy Harper from the Cincinnati Reds.

References

External links

1942 births
Living people
Amarillo Gold Sox players
Baseball players from California
Carlsbad Potashers players
Chicago Cubs players
Dallas–Fort Worth Spurs players
Fort Worth Cats players
Indianapolis Indians players
Major League Baseball outfielders
People from North Hills, Los Angeles
Salt Lake City Bees players
St. Cloud Rox players
Tacoma Cubs players
Tri-City Braves players
Wenatchee Chiefs players
Sportspeople from Erie, Pennsylvania